Bracha Fuld (born Barbara Fuld; 26 December 1927 – 26 March 1946) was a Jewish resistance fighter who died in an attempt to help Jewish Holocaust refugees enter Palestine. She was the first female Jewish soldier killed during the pre-state conflict with the British.

Early life 
Fuld was born Barbara Fuld in 1927 in Berlin, Germany. Her father had served in the German army during WWI, and he took his own life after the events of Kristallnacht in 1938, unable to reconcile his Jewish and German identities.

Fuld's older sister, Hannelore, also known as "Petra" (1923-2008, later Mrs. Morton Netzorg), had been sent to the United States to escape antisemitism. In 1939, Fuld left Germany and immigrated with her mother to Palestine, where Fuld became known as Bracha instead of Barbara. Fuld's mother, Charlotte "Lotte" Fuld, opened a candy store.

Military career 
Upon graduating high school in 1944, aged 16, Fuld joined the Palmach, an elite Jewish military force that was working with the British. She was assigned to "H" company and stationed in Kibbutz Kiryat Anavim, near Jerusalem. She was named an outstanding cadet, and was one of the few women who trained to become a squad commander. She was made an officer at the age of eighteen. Fuld first instructed women soldiers, and was later put in charge of several platoons and military detachments. Fuld became romantically involved with a fellow Palmach member, Gideon Peli.

At the end of WWII, the British attempted to stop Jewish Holocaust refugees from coming to Palestine, and the Palmach fighters revolted. They began to sabotage and assault the British military, while helping to smuggle Jewish immigrants into Palestine.

Death and legacy 

In March 1946, a ship of illegal Jewish migrants from Italy was set to arrive in Palestine. Fuld and her squad were sent to protect a stretch of road that would be used to help the immigrants reach safety. The ship was captured and diverted by the British to Atlit before arriving, but the message to abort the mission did not reach Fuld and her squad in time, and they soon encountered a British tank unit. After an exchange of fire, Fuld was badly wounded. Instead of receiving medical treatment, she was taken to a police station to be interrogated, and she died of her injuries shortly afterwards on 26 March 1946. Fuld was the first female Jewish fighter killed resisting the British during the pre-state conflict.

Six months after her death, a ship for transporting illegal Jewish immigrants was named the S. S. Bracha Fuld, which the British soon seized. The song “Banu Heinah” (We Came Here) was written to memorialize her.

In the city of Tel Aviv, Bracha Fuld Street is named in her honour.

References

External links 

 Fuld Family Papers at the Bentley Historical Library (University of Michigan)

1927 births
1946 deaths
Palmach members
Women in 20th-century warfare
People from Berlin
German emigrants to Mandatory Palestine
Jewish women
Aliyah Bet activists
Victims of police brutality
Burials at Nahalat Yitzhak Cemetery
Women in war in the Middle East
Deaths by firearm in Israel